Alejandro Higuera Osuna (born 17 February 1963) is a Mexican politician affiliated with the National Action Party. As of 2014 he served as Deputy of the LIX Legislature of the Mexican Congress representing Sinaloa.

References

1963 births
Living people
Politicians from Sinaloa
People from Mazatlán
National Action Party (Mexico) politicians
20th-century Mexican politicians
21st-century Mexican politicians
Members of the Congress of Sinaloa
Deputies of the LIX Legislature of Mexico
Members of the Chamber of Deputies (Mexico) for Sinaloa